Eric Aho (born 1966) is an American painter living in Vermont. DC Moore Gallery in New York City represents his work.

Early life
Aho was born in  Melrose, Massachusetts  and moved to New Hampshire with his family in 1974. His father, whose parents had emigrated from Finland, worked for the Boston and Maine Railroad.

Studies
Aho studied at the Central School of Art and Design in London, England, (1986–87) and received a BFA  from the Massachusetts College of Art and Design in 1988. In 1989 he participated in the first exchange of scholars in over thirty years between the U.S. and Cuba. He completed his graduate work at the Lahti Art Institute (now the Lahti University of Applied Sciences) in Finland supported by a Fulbright Scholarship in 1991-92 and an American-Scandinavian Foundation grant in 1993.

Career
Aho's paintings are noted for the way they simultaneously convey the power and fragility of Nature. In an essay about Aho's painting, Donald Kuspit wrote: "He is a master of the natural sublime, but he realizes that intensely experienced nature becomes uncannily abstract, with no loss of concreteness. Aho puts the sublime back in nature, suggesting its abstract structure without denying its concrete fullness." He adds, "Aho regenerates abstraction by returning to its roots in the boundless generativity of nature, and with that gives us a fresh aesthetic consciousness of it."

From 1989 to 1998 Aho taught painting at the Putney School in Putney, Vermont. Since 1998 Aho has held an adjunct position as visiting lecturer in the Graduate Light Design Program at the University of the Arts in Helsinki, Finland, and has taught at the University of Lapland in Rovaniemi, Finland. He has been a visiting artist and critic at the Burren College of Art in County Clare, Ireland; the Ballinglen Arts Foundation in County Mayo Ireland; the Weir Farm National Historic Trust in Connecticut; Colgate University in Hamilton, New York; the National College of Art in Oslo, Norway; the University of Art and Design in Helsinki, Finland; the St. Paul's School, Concord, New Hampshire and the Harvard Graduate School of Design.

Aho's exhibitions include the Portland Museum of Art in Portland, Maine; the Aldrich Museum of Contemporary Art in Ridgefield, CT; the Ogunquit Museum of American Art; the McMullen Museum at Boston College; the Nagoya/Boston Museum of Fine Arts, Nagoya, Japan; the National Academy of Design and the American Academy of Arts and Letters in New York City.  The Oulu Museum of Art in Oulu, Finland; the Fleming Museum at the University of Vermont; The Currier Museum of Art, Manchester, NH; the Hood Museum of Art, Hanover, NH and the New Britain Museum of American Art, CT have presented solo exhibitions. 
    
His paintings can be found in public collections throughout the country and abroad including the permanent collections of the Fine Arts Museum of San Francisco, the Springfield Art Museum, the Currier Museum of Art, the Hood Museum of Art, the Metropolitan Museum of Art, and the Museum of Fine Arts, Boston.

Ice Cuts 
In the winter of 2016 the Hood Museum of Art presented Eric Aho: Ice Cuts curated by Katherine W. Hart. Aho's paintings of stark holes cut into a frozen pond prompted Hart to call Aho "One of the leading painters of landscape and the environment of his generation." Ice Cuts also brought praise from Sebastian Smee of the Boston Globe who wrote: "Aho’s paintings enact an answer to mysterious, counterintuitive questions. The dynamic between black water and white ice is also a correlative — natural, not forced or contrived — of the much-masticated tension in 20th-century art between abstract and representational imagery, between the real and the reproduced." Smee concluded by declaring the work "a major accomplishment."

In December 2016 Sebastian Smee of the Boston Globe included Eric Aho: Ice Cuts in his "year-end round up." Smee wrote, "Eric Aho’s paintings of plunge pools cut out of ice at the Hood at Dartmouth College were fresh, bold, subtle, and urgent."

Solo exhibitions

2017 
Eric Aho: Inflection Point, DC Moore Gallery, New York

2016 

Eric Aho: An Unfinished Point in a Vast Surrounding, New Britain Museum of American Art, CT

Eric Aho: Ice Cuts, Hood Museum of Art, Hanover, NH

2015 

Eric Aho: Wilderness Studio, DC Moore Gallery, New York

2013 

Eric Aho: Translation, DC Moore Gallery, New York

Eric Aho: In the Landscape, Federal Reserve Board, Washington

2012 

Transcending Nature: Paintings by Eric Aho, Currier Museum of Art, Manchester, NH

2011 

Eric Aho: Covert, DC Moore Gallery, New York

2010 

Occurrence, Tory Folliard Gallery, Milwaukee

Eric Aho: Memory and Invention, Hidell Brooks Gallery, Charlotte, NC

2009 

Eric Aho: Red Winter, DC Moore Gallery, New York

Eric Aho: Ice Box, Brattleboro Museum, VT

2008 

Wilderness, Alpha Gallery, Boston

Outermost, Brickwalk Fine Art, West Hartford, CT

2007 

Quarry, Reeves Contemporary, New York

New Paintings, Tory Folliard Gallery, Milwaukee

2006 

The Becoming Line: Pastel Drawings, Brickwalk Fine Art, West Hartford, CT

Copper Field Suite: New Monotypes, Center for Contemporary Printmaking, Norwalk, CT

Geography IV, Alpha Gallery, Boston

Paintings, Hidell Brooks Gallery, Charlotte, NC

2005 

New Paintings, Reeves Contemporary, New York

Paintings, Tory Folliard Gallery, Milwaukee

Monotypes, Devin Borden Hiram Butler Gallery, Houston

2004 

Paintings, Spheris Gallery, Bellows Falls, VT

New Paintings, Alpha Gallery, Boston

Texas Papers, Devin Borden Hiram Butler Gallery, Houston

2003 

The Overstory, Reeves Contemporary, New York

Paintings, Gallery BE’19, Helsinki

Recent Work, Paesaggio Gallery, West Hartford, CT

The Overhead Lake: New Paintings, Hargate Art Center, St. Paul's School, Concord, NH

Tremaine Gallery, Hotchkiss School, Lakeville, CT

2002 

New Paintings, Munson Gallery, Santa Fe

Watershed: Paintings of the Connecticut River Valley, Saint-Gaudens National Historic Site, Cornish, NH

Distances: Paintings of New England and Ireland, Alpha Gallery, Boston

2001 

Three Counties, Spheris Gallery, Walpole, NH

The River, Field and Sky: New Paintings, Susan Conway Gallery, Washington

2000 

Standing Still, New Paintings, Munson Gallery, Santa Fe

Pure Geography, Barton-Ryan Gallery, Boston

1999 

The Distant Landscape: New Paintings, Spheris Gallery,  Walpole, NH

New Helsinki Views, Galleria Pintura, Helsinki

A Passion for Winter: The Landscapes of Eric Aho, Susan Conway Gallery, Washington

1998 

Recent Paintings, Spheris Gallery, Walpole, NH

The Qualities of Heaven and Earth, Oulu City Art Museum, Finland; Vermont College, Montpelier; Embassy of Finland, Washington

1996 

Nocturnes: Recent Paintings by Eric Aho, Fleming Museum, University of Vermont, Burlington

1994 

Paintings, Gallery Pelin, Helsinki

1991 

Paintings from the Hemlock Ravine, Tyler Gallery, Marlboro College, VT

Reviews and Press Mentions 
 Smee, Sebastian. "The Year in Arts: Much great art, many fine shows, but no blocks busted," Boston Globe, December 16, 2016
 Spiegelman, Willard. "In Connecticut, Discovering American Art’s First Home," The Wall Street Journal, August 8, 2016
 Dunne, Susan. "Eric Aho’s Wartime-Inspired Abstract Landscapes At NBMAA," Hartford Courant, June 27, 2016
 Butler, Sharon. "Eric Aho Shadows His Father at the New Britain," Two Coats of Paint (Internet), July 26, 2016
 O’Shaughnessy, Tracey. "The Private Power of Landscapes," Waterbury Republican American, June 5, 2016
 Vermont Public Radio, 2016, "Looking Into The Ice, Saxtons River Artist Meditates On Winter"
 Boston Globe, January 2016, "New England artist Aho breaks ice with new body of work"
 Valley News, February 2016, "Art Notes: Painter Eric Aho Looks Deep Into a Hole in the Ice"
 Art New England, March 2016, "Eric Aho, Ice Cuts"
 American Art Collector, 2016
 DC Moore Gallery Art New England, July/August 2012
 Art News, December 2011 "Eric Aho: DC Moore Gallery
 Art in America, December 2009
 Art Daily, October 2009, "First Presentation of Eric Aho's Work at DC Moore Gallery"

Related Publications 
Eric Aho: Inflection Point, 2017, introduction by Bridgette Moore and artist statement by Eric Aho, published by DC Moore Gallery, 23 pages

Eric Aho: Ice Cuts, January 2016, Katherine W. Hart and Eric Aho, published by the Hood Museum of Art, Dartmouth College, 24 pages

Eric Aho: Wilderness Studio, 2015, essay by Nathan Kernan, published by DC Moore Gallery, 68 pages

Eric Aho: Translation, 2013, essay by Diana Tuite, published by DC Moore Gallery, 70 pages

Transcending Nature: Paintings by Eric Aho, 2012, essays by P. Andrew Spahr and Bruce McColl; interview by Chard deNiord, published by DC Moore Gallery, 104 pages

Eric Aho: Covert, 2011, essay by Donald Kuspit, published by DC Moore Gallery, 32 pages

Eric Aho: Red Winter, 2009, essay by Bonnie Costello, published by DC Moore Gallery, 28 pages

Read more essays about Aho and his work.

References

External links 
 DC Moore Gallery
 DNA Gallery
 Eric Aho biography



1966 births
Living people
Artists from Vermont
20th-century American painters
20th-century American male artists
American male painters
21st-century American painters
21st-century American male artists
Alumni of the Central School of Art and Design
People from Melrose, Massachusetts
American people of Finnish descent